Washed Ashore is a project of the Artula Institute for Art and Environmental Education U.S. 501(c)(3) grassroots non-profit environmental organization that works to bring awareness to the world's growing plastic pollution problem through art.  Washed Ashore is a large touring exhibit composed of massive sculptures made up of marine debris collected by volunteers primarily along the southern coast of Oregon. Angela Haseltine Pozzi is the founder and creative director. 

The mission statement is 
"To bring awareness to the ocean’s plastic pollution problem and influence consumer habits by creating community built aesthetically powerful art.

History
Founded in 2010 by Angela Haseltine Pozzi, an artist and educator for over 30 years, the unique non-profit organization has built over 66 giant sculptures from over 17 tons of ocean garbage, and the exhibit, including educational signage, has appeared at numerous venues including SeaWorld Parks throughout the US, The Virginia Aquarium, San Francisco Zoo, The Marine Mammal Center in Sausalito, California Newport Visual Arts Center, the Chula Vista, California Nature Center, Portland Community College, America's Cup Healthy Oceans Exhibit and the Oregon Coast Aquarium.

Workshop
Based in Bandon, Oregon, the project uses local and area volunteers in workshops held at Bandon's Harbortown Event Center Thursdays through Saturdays (winter hours).  The workshops consist of assembling "piece work"  which involves drilling holes through plastic and stitching the plastic to wire mesh.  These panels will later be fastened by Lead Artist, Angela Haseltine Pozzi, and her team, to welded structures and other artwork as part of Washed Ashore's Traveling Exhibits.

References

Ocean pollution